Monywa is the largest city in Sagaing Region, Myanmar, located  north-west of Mandalay on the eastern bank of the River Chindwin. Monywa is one of the largest economic cities in Myanmar.

It is also known as Neem city because many of the city's streets are lined with Neem trees.

Climate
Monywa and neighbouring parts of the “Dry Valley” are the only places in South East Asia where the hot semi-arid climate (Köppen BSh) occurs. The city misses the tropical savanna climate (Köppen Aw) classification due to the very high temperatures and resultant high evaporation levels, alongside a long dry season. The semi-aridity has to do with the “Dry Valley” being located in the rain shadow of the Arakan Mountains. The early monsoon months from April to July are especially hot, with average high temperatures reaching  in April.

Monywa received  of rainfall on 19 October 2011. This was a new record for rainfall within 24 hours in October in Monywa for the last 47 years.

Transport

Monywa is served by the Mandalay-Budalin branch railway line, but is best reached by bus as the road from Mandalay is in reasonably good shape. Monywa is linked by road to Budalin, Dabayin, Ye-U and Kin-U, and by rail to Sagaing and the Mandalay - Myitkyina line.

Economy

Monywa is a major centre for trade and commerce and for agricultural produce from the surrounding Chindwin valley, especially beans, orange, pulses and jaggery (palm sugar). In addition, the local industry includes mills for the production of cotton, flour, noodles, and edible oils. Sausages from Alon called wet udaunk are quite popular, and Budalin longyi (sarong) is known for the strength of the fabric and its checked patterns. Monywa's rough cotton blankets are famous throughout Myanmar (with Monywa providing 80% of the country's blankets for a century), and some can even be found sewn up into knapsacks sold to unsuspecting tourists in Bangkok. Other regional crafts include bamboo and reed products, bullock carts and agricultural implements. The village of Kyaukka is well known for its lacquerware utensils for everyday use.

Black market goods from India, especially saris and bicycle parts, pass through Monywa on their way to other parts of Myanmar.

Attractions

The major tourist attraction in Monywa is Thambuddhe Pagoda , a Buddhist temple with a huge stupa resembling Indonesia's Borobudur. It dates from 1303, although it was reconstructed in 1939. It is said to contain over 500,000 images of Buddha. Close by is the Maha Bodhi Tahtaung Laykyun Sekkya standing Buddha statue, the 3rd tallest statue in the world, with 115.82 metres (at a total of 129.23 metres, including pedestal). This is the focal point of a sprawling site filled with Buddha statues, bodhi trees, and pagodas, established by the Maha Bodhi Ta Htaung Sayadaw in the 1960s. It includes also a 95-metre long reclining Buddha statue.

Nyaung-gan Bronze Age cemetery, dated to between 1,500 BCE and 500 BCE, in Budalin with bronze tools, ceramics and stone artifacts is 60 minutes travel on a narrow road north of Monywa.

Very few tourists visit Monywa as its facilities are limited.

Education

The city is home to:
Monywa University
Monywa Education College
Monywa University of Economics
Technological University, Monywa and
Computer University, Monywa

Health care

Public Hospitals 
 Monywa General Hospital
 Monywa Women and Children Hospital

Politics
The insurgent Burmese Communist Party (BCP) was centred in the Monywa area (west of the Chindwin River) for many years. Although the BCP is no longer active, the Myanmar military presence in Monywa remains heavy.

Writing community 
Monywa is known nationally as a center for poets, and is often described as the poetic center of the north of Myanmar. It is home to contemporary poet and publisher Min Swe Hnit, who has published nearly 100 volumes of poetry as of Winter 2019. Monywa is also home to contemporary poet and political commentator Kyi Zaw Aye.

Notable residents
Thant Sin Maung
Tun Kyi
Kyaw Hsan
U Lu Tin (1930-)

Gallery

Notes

External links

City of Monywa
Burman photograph album 1897 Old photos of Monywa
Chindwin River - lifeblood of upper Sagaing Myanmar Times, January 16–22, 2006

Populated places in Sagaing Region
Township capitals of Myanmar